In computer programming, data types can be divided into two categories: value types (or by-value types) and reference types (or by-reference types). Value types are completely represented by their meaning, while reference types are references to another value.

Value types 

A value is a fully self-describing piece of data. Equal values are indistinguishable at program runtime. That is, they lack identity.

For example, in the C++ and Java programming languages, the integer literal  is a value.

In many programming languages, value types are often represented and stored in an efficient manner. For example, booleans, fixed-size integers, and fixed-size floating-point types may be compactly stored and passed in the registers of the CPU.

Reference types 

Reference types are represented as a reference to another value, which may itself be either a value or reference type. Reference types are often implemented using pointers, though many high-level programming languages such as Java and Python do not expose these pointers to the programmer.

Reference types have identity, meaning that it is possible to distinguish two references at runtime, even when they contain underlying values that are equal. For example, consider the following class in Java:

public class BoxedInt {
    public int innerValue;

    public BoxedInt(int i) {
        this.innerValue = i;
    }
}

Two invocations of  will yield two objects observably distinct from each other, even though they contain the same value . In this case, two separate memory allocations were made, and the value  placed into each.

Classification per language

Boxing and unboxing 

Programming languages that distinguish between value types and reference types typically offer a mechanism, called boxing, to wrap some or all of their value types in reference types. This permits the use of value types in contexts expecting reference types. The converse process (to unwrap the value type) is known as unboxing.

See also 
 Primitive data type
 Composite data type

Notes 
 The C++ standard does not use the term "value type" as defined above. Rather, a C++ object is defined as storing a value, which may be of a primitive or compound type; in addition, whether an object has a name or not is optional. In the standard library, the term "value type" is largely restricted to type definitions inside container and wrapper class templates, where the specified type of the objects stored in an instance of the class template is given the moniker value_type (for example, the types std::vector<T>::value_type and T are equivalent, where T is the type used to instantiate the vector).
 In C++, pointers are objects, unlike references: they store their own values, may or may not be named, and can be used as value types of container and wrapper class templates.

References 

Data types